Of the first historically verifiable rulers of Frisia, whether they are called dukes or kings, the last royal dynasty below is established by the chronicles of Merovingian kings of the Franks, with whom they were contemporaries. In these contemporary chronicles, they were styled dux, a Latin term for leader which is the origin of the title duke and its cognates in other languages (duc, duce, doge, duque, etc.).  They were independent until the death of Radbod at the earliest.

After coming under Frankish rule, Frisia was governed by counts the power of these counts was very limited due to the decentralized nature of the region specifically due to the terrain. Following the Treaty of Verdun and Treaty of Meersen the Frisians east of the Vlie came under the rule of the Saxon kings of East Francia, The Saxon counts that formally owned parts of Frisia generally held little power in the region and relied on local nobles to exploit the territory in exchange for power and protection. The Frisians were ruled by Frana and Skelta, members of the local nobility that were sometimes elected but most times appointed by counts. about halfway into the 12th century, with the declining power of counts and the increasing autonomy the Frana and Skelta were replaced with the Grytmen in middle Frisia or Redjeva further east of the Lauwers. The Grytmen were ultimately turned into Mayors by Thorbecke in 1851.

Finn, son of Folcwald, is a semi-legendary figure. He was killed by Hengest, who later migrated to Britain and founded the Kingdom of Kent. For rulers prior to Finn the later Frisians developed a rich store of legend and myth, and these too are listed here in chronological order.

Frisian Kingdom

House of Frisia 
Note that the house and several members of the house of Frisia may be mythological, many people have claimed to be descendants of historical figures and many people have tried to create a continuous dynasty, rather than accepting that most likely a lot of historical figures were unrelated perhaps elected rather than inheriting titles. It has also been suggested that there were several smaller Frisian kingdoms, rather than one large kingdom.

After the Migration Period, the Frisian Kingdom emerged around 600 AD, north of the Frankish Kingdom. The Frisians consisted of tribes with loose bonds, and were not the same Frisii from Roman times. Under Redbad the Frisian kingship reached its maximum geographic development, covering most of the area of what is now the Netherlands and the coast in northern Germany. In 722 the Frisian land west of the Vlie (what is now Holland, Utrecht and Zeeland came in Frankish hands. In 734, in the Battle of the Boarn, the area west of the Lauwers (nowadays Friesland) resulted in a Frankisch victory and the end of the Frisian kingdom. Only the Frisians east of the Lauwers (Groningen and East Frisia) remained independent. In 772 they lost their independence as well.

After Poppo's defeat all of Frisia is considered technically part of the Frankish Empire, however some sources continue the kingdom east of the Lauwers
 734–741, Aldgisl II, loyal Christian vassal of the Franks, brother of Poppo 
 741–748, Gundebold, son of Aldgisl II
 749-775?, Radbod II, grew up in the court of the King of Denmark, possibly Harald Wartooth 
Radbod II participates in the Saxon rebellion but is defeated, he is thought to have fled back to Denmark, the Kingdom of Frisia was now dissolved

Frankish Frisia 

Poppo's defeat generally marks the conquest of Frisia by the Franks, following the defeat Frisia is divided in three parts:
West Frisia, the region from the Scheldt to the Vlie roughly the modern region of Holland conquered in 719
Middle Frisia, the region from the Vlie to the Lauwers roughly the modern territory of the province Fryslân conquered in 734
East Frisia, the region from the Lauwers to the Weser conquered in 775
It is further divided in Gaue

In 775 the Franks under Charlemagne took control of what remained of the Frisian territory (East Frisia) and incorporated it into their kingdom. Counts appointed by the Frankish rulers were:

West Frisia 719-1101 
 793–810, Nordalah, ruled Wieringen
 -837, Ekkehard(Eggihard), ruled Walcheren

House of Jutland 
 841–844, Harald the Younger, in Walcheren 
 855–873, Rodulf Haraldsson, succeeded Harald the Younger, his region of Zeeland became part of West Francia after the Treaty of Meersen 
 839–875, Rorik of Dorestad, acquired all of West Frisia, Utrecht and Dorestad, ruled from Wieringen

House of Godfrid 
 882–885, Godfrid, reconquered Rorik's domain

House of West Frisia 

Godfrid was ambushed and killed, count Gerolf is believed to have been one of the nobles involved in the attack as he is rewarded shortly after with most of Godfrid's domain: the coastline from Vlie to Meuse and upriver the Gaue Nifterlake, Lek & IJssel and several properties in Teisterbant
 883–916, Gerulf the younger, plausible son of Deodred (Diederik)
 916–939, Dirk I, Dirk inherited most of the coastline of Gerulf's domain. Waldger, Dirk's brother inherited the eastern inland territories.
 939–988, Dirk II, Ruled West Frisia now roughly the Gaue Maasland, Kennemerland and Texel
 988–993, Arnulf I, killed by rebelling Frisians,  for the Frisians of roughly the Gau Westflinge this marks the beginning of the Frisian Freedom and approximately 300 years of self-governance
 993–1039, Dirk III, moved his court south to Vlaardingen 
 1039–1049, Dirk IV
 1049–1061, Floris I, brother of Dirk IV
 1061–1091, Dirk V, fought a long war to claim his inheritence
 1091–1101, Floris II the Fat, the title "Count of Frisia west of the Vlie" was changed to "Count of Holland". Continues in Counts of Holland.

Middle Frisia 734-1222 
 734?-754-768, Alfbad (Praefectus Abba), governed at least Oostergo
 768–793, Theoderic (Diederik), killed in the Uprising of 793, his domain is unknown but likely somewhere in between the Vlie and Weser
 810-834 & 839-???, Gerulf the elder, plausible son of theoderic, Reeve of Frisians from Vlie to Weser
 c.820, Deodred (Diederik), plausible son of Gerulf the elder, held lands in the Westerkwartier
 824?-834-855, Gerhart, plausibly related to Deodred, ruled in Westergo 
 855–870, Wiccing, also held lands in Westerkwartier
 870-873?, Albdag, defended Oostergo against Rodulf Haraldsson
 -885-, Gardulf, mentioned together with Gerulf the younger and plausibly related
 921–945, Reginbert, Ruled in Franeker the traditional seat of government for Westergo and likely family of the Reginingen that held considerable property across Middle Frisia and the west Frisian Islands
 945–966, Gerbert, son of Reginbert

In 775, Charles the Great made Frisia officially part of the Frankish Kingdom. The wars ended with the last uprising of the Frisians in 793 and the pacification of them. Counts were appointed by the Frankish rulers. However, Danish Vikings raided Frisia in the end of the 9th century and established Viking rule. After the division of the Frankish Kingdom in West Francia and East Francia, they gained more autonomy.

House of Billung 
 955–994, Ekbert the one eyed, inherits frisian lands likely through his maternal grandmother Reginhilde, possible sister of Reginbert and mother of Matilda of Ringelheim
 994-1024-1030?, Wichmann III & ekbert, sons of Egbert the one eyed

House of Brunswick 
 1024?-1038, Liudolf, either through marriage with the daughter of Ekbert or conquest
 1038–1057, Bruno, son of Liudolf, expands middle frisia with the ommelanden
 1057–1068, Egbert I, son of Bruno
 1068-1086?-1089, Egbert II, son of Egbert I, punished for his participation in the Saxon Rebellion
 1089–1099, Egbert's properties in Frisia are given to the Bishopric of Utrecht, Bishop Conrad

House of Nordheim 
 1099–1101, Henry I the Fat, through marriage with Gertrude, daughter of Egbert II, Murdered on arrival
 1101–1117, Otto III, son of Henry the fat
 1117-?, Otto I, Count of Salm, through marriage with Gertrude of Northeim, the daughter of Henry the fat
Otto III fails to establish his rule in Frisia and the land reverts to the bishop of Utrecht, Utrecht and Holland fight over the rights to middle Frisia and from 1165 rule it in condominium, failing to agree on a ruler the Frisians are left to rule themselves.

House of Holland 
 1203?-1222, William of Frisia, in 1178 William's brother Baldwin becomes bishop of Utrecht while his other brother Dirk VII is Count of Holland so Holland and Utrecht agree to make William ruler of middle Frisia, his power in Frisia fades after his victory in the Loon War and his descendants would not inherit it. Many Frisians followed William in the Fifth crusade as documented in De itinere Frisonum.

Upstalsboom Treaty 
 1156, The Frisian diet or ding at the Upstalsboom. What starts out as a loose gathering becomes an increasingly formal alliance or Confederacy, in a response to increased aggression from the counts of Holland, continues in Potestates

East Frisia 775-1220

House of Frisia 
 734–741, Aldgisl II
 741–748, Gundebold
 749–775, Radbod II
 768–793, Theoderic (Diederik), killed in the Uprising of 793, his domain is unknown but likely somewhere in between the Vlie and Weser
 810-834 & 839-???, Gerulf the elder

After Radbod II east Frisia is firmly in the hands of the Frankish kings, they divide the region in at least two parts. how the region between the Lauwers and the Eems is defined remains unclear. the western part of East Frisia was centered around the mouth of the Eems roughly corresponding to Emsgau and Federgau. While the eastern part was centered around the mouth of the Wezer encompassing Rustringen, Astergau, the Nordendi and the Wangerland, assumed to be the county of Riustringen that Harald Klak received.

Fivelingau 
 c.820, Diederik, held lands in the Westerkwartier
 855–870, Wiccing, also held lands in Westerkwartier

House of Meginhard 
 843–880, Wichman II
 892–932, Ekbert, also known as Egbert Billung

House of Billung 
 932–938, Wichman I, 
 936?-973, Herman I

?-1044, Rudolf von Werl

House of Brunswick 
 1047–1057, Bruno, expands middle frisia with the ommelanden 
 1057–1061, Egbert I
 1068–1089, Egbert II

Not much is known about the region following the Brunonen, it eventually joins into the Upstalboom treaty. The city of Groningen, at the time in Drenthe becomes very powerful. It quickly becomes an important member of the free Frisian lands and towards the end of the 14th century comes to rule over the Ommelanden.
Groningen joined the other six provinces in Februari 1595 and formed the seventh province of the Seven Provinces

Emsgau

822–855, Cobbo the Elder, possible son of Ekbert duke of Saxony at the time

-899- Adalbert
 Herman
 c.947-955, Hendrik
 c.955-986, Herman I
 997–1024, Herman II
 c.1031-1038-1070, Bernard & Adalbert, ruled Emsgau & Federgau respectively
 c.1092-1096, Koenraad

Given to the Bishop of Bremen

House of Calvelage 
 c.1100-1134 Herman or Herman II
 1134–1175, Otto I
 1175-c.1220, Herman III
The house of Calvelage likely never stepped foot in east Frisia and lost their belongings when the region entered into the Upstalboom treaty, continues in Potestates

Riustringen 
 772–793, Unno & Eilrad

House of Jutland 
 827-852?, Harald Klak, was gifted Riustringen by Louis the Pious

House of Stade 
 847?-880, Lothar I
 880–929, Lothar II
 -976, Henry the Bald

House of Billung 
Directly ruled under the following dukes of Saxony
 976–1011, Bernard, 
 1011–1059, Bernard II
 1059–1072, Ordulf
 1072–1106, Magnus

House of Oldenburg 
Following the end of house Billung in 1106 the east of Riustringen is slowly being conquered by the county of Oldenburg, the remainder joined into the Frisian alliance, continues in Potestates

Dux & Margraves

Dux 
Dux should not be confused with Duke, the Frisian Dux was a military commander responsible for the defence of the Frisian territory, particularly against the Norse raiders.
 783–793, Theodoric, killed in the Uprising of 793
 794-???, possibly Meginhard I  
 812–834, Gerulf the Elder, was punished for failing to hold back the Norsemen
 834–837, Hemming Halfdansson 
 839-c.860, Rorik of Dorestad
 867–870, Ubbe Ragnarsson, sources mention him as Dux Frisonum, the timeframe corresponds roughly with Rodulf Haraldsson’s presence in Frisia which has led people to believe they are the same person
 870-875, Rorik of Dorestad, returns 
 882-885, Godfrid, Duke of Frisia
 885-898, Everhard Saxo, killed by Waldger of Teisterbant

Margraves 
 1024-1038, Liudolf 
 1038-1057, Bruno 
 1057-1068, Egbert I 
 1068-1089, Egbert II
 1099-1101, Henry I the Fat

Potestates

mythological 
Most of the early potestaats are completely legendary.
 Magnus Forteman, fl. 809 (first recipient of the Karelsprivilege)
 Taco Ludigman, fl. c. 830 (Focko Ludigman) (protected the country against pirates)
 Adelbrik Adelen, fl. c. 830 (won a victory over a Swedish duke at Kollum)
 Hessel Hermana, 869-876 (a diligent warrior against the Vikings)
 Igo Galema (Ygo Galema), 876-910
 Gosse Ludigman, 986-1000
 Saco Reinalda, 1150-1167 (many Frisians were recruited into the crusades to the Holy Land)

generally accepted 
From here the evidence for their existence is considerably better supported
 Sicko Sjaerdema, 1237-1260 (Count William II of Holland offered him regional rule of Friesland)
 Reinier Camminga, 1300-1306 (killed in the fight against "Danes Noertmannen ende")
 Hessel Martena, 1306-1313 (protected Friesland against the attacks of the counts of Holland)
 Juw Juwinga (Jonghema Ju), 1396 (killed in the Battle of Schoterzijl against Albert I, Duke of Bavaria)
 Sytse Dekama, 1397-?
 Gale Hania
 Odo Botnia, ?-1399
 Sjoerd Wiarda, 1399-1410 (elected by the Schieringers for Oostergo)
 Haring Haringsma (Haring Harinxma, or Haring Thoe Heeg), 1399-1404 (elected by the Schieringers for Westergo)

In 1464, Ulrich I of East Frisia was raised to the status of Count by Frederick III, Holy Roman Emperor, and East Frisia became a separate county. Continues in List of counts of East Frisia

 Juw Dekama, 1494-1498 (died 1523) (only governed Oostergo)

With the victory of the Schieringers against the Vetkopers, the office passed to the dukes of Saxony:
 Albert, Duke of Saxony, 1498-1500 (appointed by Maximilian I, Holy Roman Emperor)
 Henry IV, Duke of Saxony, 1500-1505 (died 1541)
 George, Duke of Saxony, 1505-1515 (died 1539)

Stadtholders 
In 1515, George of Saxony sold Friesland to the future Emperor Charles V. The Habsburgs appointed the following governors:

 Floris van Egmond, Count of Buren and Leerdam, 1515-1518
 Wilhelm von Roggendorf, 1518-1521
 Georg Schenck van Toutenburg, 1521-1540
 Jancko Douwama, 1522
In 1523, Jancko Douwama is imprisoned, this and the end of The Frisian Peasant Rebellion generally marks the end to the Frisian Freedom
 Maximiliaan van Egmond, Count of Buren, 1540-1548
 Jean de Ligne, Count of Arenberg, 1549-1568 (in 1556 sovereignty of Friesland passed to King Philip II of Spain, son of Charles V)
 Karel van Brimeu, Count of Megen, 1568-1572
 Gillis van Berlaymont, of Hierges, 1572-1574
 Caspar de Robles, Master of Billy, 1574-1576 (or 1572–1576)
 George de Lalaing, Count of Rennenberg, de Stadhouder-verrader, 1576-1581 (after 1580 in the service of Phillip II)
 Francisco Verdugo, 1581-1594 (in the service of Phillip II)
 Willem I van Oranje-Nassau, 1580-1584

In 1581, Friesland and six other provinces revolted and formed the Dutch Republic. The office of stadholder became hereditary in the House of Oranje:

 Willem Lodewijk van Nassau, 1584-1620
 Ernst Casimir, 1620-1632
 Hendrik Casimir I, 1632-1640
 Willem Frederik, 1640-1664
 Hendrik Casimir II, 1664-1696
 Johan Willem Friso of Orange, 1696-1711
 William IV of Orange, 1711-1751 (the seven provincial stadtholders within the Dutch Republic merged in 1747)
 William V of Orange, 1751-1795 (died 1806) (Stadtholder-General of the Dutch Republic until it was destroyed by Napoleon)

Fictional rulers 
A description of a course at the University of Amsterdam states ""One of the characteristics of Frisian historiography and literature from the Middle-Ages up to the nineteenth and twentieth century is the existence of a comprehensive corpus of fantastic, apocryphal and mystified historic works, which deal with the origins and identity of the Frisians. Well known examples are medieval myths of origin like the Gesta Frisiorum or the Tractatus Alvini, sixteenth-century humanistic scholarly books by e.g. Suffridus Petrus, Ocko van Scarl en Martinus Hamconius and nineteenth-century forgeries like the Tescklaow and the infamous Oera Linda Book."

The 17th century chronicle Frisia seu de viris rebusque illustribus, by Martinus Hamconius, purported to list the ancient kings of Frisia, beginning with Friso who had allegedly migrated from India during the time of Alexander the Great. A 19th century work, the Oera Linda Book (authorship uncertain but considered to be a hoax), embellished these stories further by describing an ancient and glorious history for the Frisians extending back thousands of years, during which time they were supposedly ruled over by a line of matriarchs known as folk-mothers, founded by the eponymous goddess Frya, ancestress of the Frisians.

Goddess and Folk-mothers 
According to the Oera Linda Book.

Frya, ?-2194 BC (eponymous ancestress of the Frisians, who supposedly inhabited all of Northern and Western Europe)
Fasta, 2194-after 2145 BC (appointed by Frya when the latter ascended to the stars during a terrible flood)
Medea
Thiania
Hellenia
(unknown)
Minna, fl. 2013 BC (faced an invasion of Finns from the east, who settled in the Frisian lands in Scandinavia)
(unknown)
Rosamond, 1631-? BC (the Frisians in Western Europe revolted and became the Celts)
Hellicht, fl. 1621 BC
(unknown)
Frana, ?-590 BC (murdered by the Finns during an invasion)
Adela (de facto), 590-559 BC (supposedly ordered the compilation of what became the Oera Linda Book)
(vacant)
Gosa, 306-before 264 BC (elected after a long vacancy, Frisian rule confined to approximately the modern Netherlands)
(vacant)
Prontlik, fl. c. 60 BC (puppet folk-mother appointed by King Asinga Ascon)

Kings (Oera Linda Book & others) 
According to the Frisia seu de viris rebusque illustribus (and the Oera Linda Book).

Friso, 313-245 BC (Adel I Friso (de facto), 304-264 BC) (established a militaristic hereditary monarchy)
Adel, 245-151 BC (Adel II Atharik, 264-? BC)
Ubbo, 151-71 BC (Adel III Ubbo)
Asinga Ascon, 71 BC-AD 11 (Adel IV Asega Askar, or Black Adel) (reviled for employing foreign troops and bringing plague)
Diocarus Segon, 11-46
Dibbaldus Segon, 46-85 (? Verritus) (forced to accept Roman protection, and may have visited Rome in person)
Tabbo, 85-130 (? Malorix)

 Dukes According to the Frisia seu de viris rebusque illustribus.

Asconius, 130-173 (title downgraded to duke as a Roman client)
Adelboldus, 173-187
Titus Boiocalus, 187-240
Ubbo, 240-299
Haron Ubbo, 299-335
Odilbaldus, 335-360
Udolphus Haron, 360-392

 Kings (Merovingian chronicles & others) According to the Frisia seu de viris rebusque illustribus (and Merovingian chronicles).Richardus, Uffo, 392-435 (? Finn Folcwalding)
Odilbaldus, 435-470 (? Sibbelt)
Richoldus, 470-533 (? Ritzard)
Beroaldus, 533-590 (? Audulf)
Adgillus I, 590-672 (Aldegisel, ?-680)
Radbodus I, 672-723 (Radbod I, 680-719)
(Poppo, 719-734) (not listed in the rebusque)
Adgillus II, 723-737 (Aldegisel II)
Gondobaldus, 737-749 (Gundebold, or Aldegisel III)
Radbodus II, 749-775 (Radbod II)

 Notes 

 References 
 Ancient Holland: The History of the Lowlands
 Petz, G.H. (ed). MGH Scriptures. (Hanover, 1892).
 Jaekel, H. (1895), Die Grafen von Mittelfriesland aus dem Geschlecht König Ratbods van Blom, Ph. (1900), Geschiedenis van Oud-Friesland. Fries Genootschap van Geschied-, Oudheid- en Taalkunde en de Fryske Akademy, (1970), De Vrije Fries (50th ed.), Leeuwarden
 Henstra, D.J. (2012), Friese graafschappen tussen Zwin en Wezer, Assen: van Gorcum, ISBN 9789023249788
 Lawætz, P. (2019), Danske vikingekonger - én slægt med mange grene'', https://vikingekonger.dk/

Frisia
Lists of French nobility